"The Trail of the Lonesome Pine" is a popular song published in 1913, with lyrics by Ballard MacDonald and music by Harry Carroll. It was inspired by John Fox Jr.'s 1908 novel of the same title, but whereas the novel was set in the Cumberland Mountains of Kentucky, the song refers to the Blue Ridge Mountains of Virginia. In it, the singer expresses his love for his girl, June, who is waiting for him under the titular pine tree. It is perhaps best known for being performed by Laurel and Hardy in the 1937 film Way Out West. This version became a UK Singles Chart hit in 1975, some years after both actors had died.

History
It was recorded by Henry Burr and Albert Campbell on March 4, 1913, and was successful in America. Elsie Baker and James F. Harrison's version also sold well in the same year.

The song was featured in Laurel and Hardy's 1937 film Way Out West. It was performed by Laurel and Hardy with The Avalon Boys and featured a section sung in deep bass by Chill Wills, lip-synced by Stan Laurel in the film, with the last two lines in falsetto (sung by Rosina Lawrence) after Ollie hit Stan on the head with a mallet. This stage routine was performed by actors Steve Coogan and John C. Reilly as part of the 2019 biographical film Stan & Ollie. In 1975, at a time when Laurel and Hardy films were popular on British television, the UK branch of United Artists Records produced an album of dialogue and songs,  Laurel & Hardy – The Golden Age Of Hollywood Comedy, which included "The Trail of the Lonesome Pine". The song was released as a single and reached No. 2 in the UK Singles Chart, thanks largely to being championed by disc jockey John Peel on his Radio 1 evening show. The song was also recorded by Vivian Stanshall and (as "Blue Ridge Mountains of Virginia") by Tokyo Blade.

The song is featured in the stage play The Trail Of The Lonesome Pine, and is played during the opening credits of the 1936 film adaptation.

"The Trail of the Lonesome Pine" was the favorite song of Gertrude Stein.

The song's melody and chorus has also been used for an American square dance in the "singing square" style, in which the dance caller's instructions are fitted to the melody and the dancers  sometimes sing along on the chorus as they return to place at the end of each repetition of the group dance figure.

Lyrics 

Verse 1

Chorus

Verse 2

References

Bibliography
MacDonald, Ballard (w.); Carroll, Harry (m.). "The Trail of the Lonesome Pine" (Sheet music). New York: Shapiro, Bernstein & Co., Inc. (1913).

External links
"The Trail of the Lonesome Pine", Manuel Romain (Edison Blue Amberol 1743, 1913)—Cylinder Preservation and Digitization Project.
 Transcription of Laurel & Hardy version

Songs with lyrics by Ballard MacDonald
Songs with music by Harry Carroll
1913 songs
1910s song stubs
1975 singles
Laurel and Hardy
Music based on novels